Events from the year 1947 in Jordan.

Incumbents
Monarch: Abdullah I 
Prime Minister: 
 until 4 February: Ibrahim Hashem
 4 February-28 December: Samir al-Rifai 
 starting 28 December: Tawfik Abu al-Huda

Politics

 1947 Transjordanian general election - General elections, 20 October.

See also

 Years in Iraq
 Years in Syria
 Years in Saudi Arabia

References

 
1940s in Jordan
Jordan
Jordan
Years of the 20th century in Jordan